Sergen may refer to:


People

Given name 
 Sergen Piçinciol (born 1995), Turkish footballer
 Sergen Yalçın (born 1972), Turkish football commentator, coach and former international footballer
 Sergen Yatağan (born 1999), Turkish footballer

Surname 
 Burak Sergen (born 1961), Turkish actor

Places 
 Sergen, Hani, a village in the Hani District of Diyarbakır Province in Turkey

See also
 Sergent (disambiguation)

Turkish masculine given names
Turkish-language surnames